In geometry, the great icosicosidodecahedron (or great icosified icosidodecahedron)  is a nonconvex uniform polyhedron, indexed as U48. It has 52 faces (20 triangles, 12 pentagrams, and 20 hexagons), 120 edges, and 60 vertices. Its vertex figure is a crossed quadrilateral.

Related polyhedra 

It shares its vertex arrangement with the truncated dodecahedron. It additionally shares its edge arrangement with the great ditrigonal dodecicosidodecahedron (having the triangular and pentagonal faces in common) and the great dodecicosahedron (having the hexagonal faces in common).

References

External links 
 

Uniform polyhedra